Eois pallidicosta is a moth in the family Geometridae. It is found in Peru.

The wingspan is about 26 mm. The forewings are red-brown, with a creamy grey costal streak with five dark speckles. The hindwings are paler towards the base and along the costa.

References

Moths described in 1907
Taxa named by William Warren (entomologist)
Eois
Moths of South America